The Book of Cynog was a text of medieval Welsh law. It is quoted extensively by surviving sources but does not appear to have survived intact. However, the first 75 folios of Peniarth MS. 35 seem to be a medieval attempt to reconstruct the earlier book.

References

Welsh manuscripts
Lost books
Legal history of Wales
Medieval Welsh law
Medieval Wales